The Yuvajana Shramika Rythu Congress Party (YSRCP or YCP) is an Indian regional political party based in the state of Andhra Pradesh. Its   president Y. S. Jagan Mohan Reddy serves as the state's chief minister. It is currently the fifth largest party in the Lok Sabha with 22 seats.

Origins 
After the sudden death of the then-incumbent Chief Minister Y. S. Rajasekhara Reddy (YSR) in a helicopter crash in September 2009, his son Y. S. Jagan Mohan Reddy, the incumbent MP from Kadapa, started an Odarpu Yatra (condolence tour) across Andhra Pradesh, to console the families of those who had committed suicide or died of shock after the death of his father. This tour was not supported by the Congress leadership. Defying the Congress Working Committee's order to call off the tour, Jagan went ahead with the first leg of the "Odarpu Yatra" in the West Godavari and Khammam districts in April 2010.

Meanwhile, Sakshi TV news channel and Sakshi newspaper, which are closely affiliated with YSR and Jagan, had been continuously criticizing the new Chief Minister Konijeti Rosaiah and the Congress leadership at New Delhi. In a special programme on Sakshi TV to mark the 125th anniversary celebrations of the Congress party, a voice-over made remarks on Sonia Gandhi and the Prime Minister Manmohan Singh on the "current state of affairs" in the State, which invited anger and protests from the Congress loyalists and increased the gap and friction between Jagan and the Congress loyalists. The channel later deleted those remarks in a re-telecast.

After accusing the Congress of ill-treating him and creating rift in his family by luring his uncle Y. S. Vivekananda Reddy (younger brother of YSR) with a state ministerial berth in the aftermath of the death of his father, Jagan and his mother Y. S. Vijayamma resigned from the Kadapa Lok Sabha and Pulivendula Assembly constituencies respectively and also as members of the Congress in November 2010. Many Congress leaders loyal to Jagan also quit the Congress and joined the YSR Congress. This resulted in the weakening of the Congress's strength in both the assembly and the Lok Sabha, necessitating by-elections.

Electoral performance 
In the ensuing by-elections, the party won most of the vacated seats with record-breaking majorities, with many of the Congress and the Telugu Desam Party (the main opposition) candidates losing their deposits. The party has a strength of 151 members in the 175-member state assembly and 22 members in the Lok Sabha (out of 25 in AP) as the election results declared on 23 May 2019, simultaneously.
In March 2012, YSR Congress won the Kovur assembly seat in Nellore district in a by-election.

On 15 June 2012, YSR Congress won the Nellore Lok Sabha seat and 15 of 18 assembly seats in Andhra Pradesh. YSRCP leaders P. Subhash Chandra Bose from Ramachandrapuram constituency of East Godavari district and Konda Surekha from Parkal constituency of Warangal district, both ministers in the YSR cabinet, had switched to YSR Congress party but lost their races.

It lost the 2014 Andhra Pradesh Legislative Assembly election to the Telugu Desam Party, which had previously been in opposition to the INC government. One-third of the MLAs who won for the YSR Congress in the 2014 elections had joined the Telugu Desam Party by 2017.

It went for 2019 general elections by appointing Prashant Kishor, a renowned political strategist in Indian elections and emerged as the 5th largest political party in India. It did not contest in Telangana Assembly election 2018.

The party won the 2019 Andhra Pradesh Legislative Assembly election in a landslide, winning 151 of the 175 seats, including a clean sweep of the Kadapa, Kurnool and Nellore districts. It has been in government since 30 May 2019.

Electoral performance

Indian general elections

State legislative assembly elections

List of party leaders

Presidents

Legislative leaders

List of chief ministers

Chief Ministers of Andhra Pradesh

Deputy chief ministers of Andhra Pradesh

List of speakers

Speakers of the Andhra Pradesh Legislative Assembly

List of deputy speakers

Deputy speakers of the Andhra Pradesh Legislative Assembly

List of leaders of the opposition

Leaders of the Opposition in the Andhra Pradesh Legislative Assembly

See also
 List of political parties in India
 List of Indian National Congress breakaway parties
 Telugu Desam Party
 Jana Sena Party

References

External links 
 

 
Political parties in Andhra Pradesh
Indian National Congress breakaway groups
2011 establishments in Andhra Pradesh
Political parties established in 2011